Larkinstown is a townland in County Westmeath, Ireland.

Larkinstown is one of 11 townlands of the civil parish of Stonehall in the barony of Corkaree in the Province of Leinster.

The neighbouring townlands are: Stonehall to the north, Blackmiles to the north–east, Galmoylestown Lower to the east, Garrysallagh to the south, Tyfarnham to the west and Killintown to the north–west.

In the 1911 census of Ireland there were 2 houses and 10 inhabitants in the townland.

References

External links
Map of Larkinstown at openstreetmap.org
Larkinstown at the IreAtlas Townland Data Base
Larkinstown at Townlands.ie
Larkinstown at The Placenames Database of Ireland

Townlands of County Westmeath